The Frances Langford Promenade (also known as the First Civic Center and the Lake Mirror Promenade) is a historic site in Lakeland, Florida. It is located between Lemon Street and Lake Mirror Drive. On January 27, 1983, it was added to the U.S. National Register of Historic Places.  The project was built in two phases and completed in 1928.  Charles Wellford Leavitt of New York was the designer.

In 1946, the city of Lakeland dedicated the promenade to Lakeland native Frances Langford for her work with the United Service Organizations and her music and acting career. In 2013, the city re-dedicated the promenade and installed a new marker.

References

External links

 Lakeland's No. 1 Sweetheart -- Frances Langford, Sep. 8, 1982, The Ledger
 Actress, Singer Frances Langford's Name Returning to Lakeland Landmark, March 31, 2013, The Ledger
 Lakeland Promenade Will Get a New Frances Langford Sign Friday, November 5, 2013, The Ledger
 Polk County listings at National Register of Historic Places
 Florida's Office of Cultural and Historical Programs
 Polk County listings
 Lake Mirror Promenade

Buildings and structures in Lakeland, Florida
National Register of Historic Places in Polk County, Florida